Mann River, a perennial stream of the Clarence River catchment, is located in the Northern Rivers district of New South Wales, Australia.

Course and features
Mann River rises at Llangothlin Lake, on the slopes of the Great Dividing Range, near Ben Lomond and flows generally north north east, east, north east and north, joined by four tributaries including the Nymboida River, Henry River and Yarrow River, before reaching its confluence with the Clarence River, southwest of Baryulgil. The river descends  over its  course; and flows through the Mann River Nature Reserve.

The river is believed to be named in honour of Samuel Furneaux Mann, who held a squatting licence for a short time in the region northwest of Glen Innes.

See also

Rivers of New South Wales

References

 

Rivers of New South Wales
Northern Rivers